Dioumara Koussata is a rural commune and village in the Cercle of Diéma in the Kayes Region of western Mali. Dioumara Koussata is one of 18 villages in the commune. In the 2009 census the commune had a population of 16,218.

References

Communes of Kayes Region